The 2008 Friends Provident Trophy was an English county cricket tournament, held between 20 April and 16 August 2008. The tournament was won by Essex.

Format 
Unlike in 2007, the 18 English counties, Ireland and Scotland were divided into four groups of five, based on geographical location. Each side played the other four teams home and away, with the top two sides from each group progressing to the quarter-final stage. A spokesman for the England and Wales Cricket Board, which instigated the changes, explained that the changes "provides  more local derbies and less travel for players". The recommendations of the Schofield Report; an investigation into England's 5–0 Ashes defeat, were also cited as a cause for the changes.

Group stage

Midlands Division

North Division

South East Division

South/West Division

Knockout stage

Quarter finals

Semi finals

Final

References

External links 
 
Competition overview  from CricketArchive
Competition overview from Cricinfo

Friends Provident Trophy seasons
Friends Provident Trophy, 2008